The Aṣṭāṅgasaṅgraha is a Sanskrit text thought to be authored by the ancient Indian scholar Vagbhata. As a part of the Brhat Trayi, it is one of the principal texts of Ayurveda, which is an indigenous medicine system of India.

See Also 

 Brhat Trayi
History of science and technology in the Indian subcontinent
Culture of India
Ethnomedicine
Herbal medicine

References 

Sanskrit texts
Ayurvedic texts
Ancient Indian medical works